Igor Sijsling is the defending champion, but withdrew prior to the tournament because of a stomach injury.
Thiemo de Bakker won the title, defeating Simon Greul 6–4, 6–2 in the final.

Seeds

Draw

Finals

Top half

Bottom half

References
 Main Draw
 Qualifying Draw

TEAN International - Singles
2012 Men's Singles